Vancouver-West End is a provincial electoral district in British Columbia, Canada, established by the Electoral Districts Act, 2008. It was contested for the first time in the 2009 election. Prior to 2009, the riding was part of Vancouver-Burrard.

This district takes in Stanley Park and Vancouver's densely populated West End neighbourhood.

Member of the Legislative Assembly
The current MLA for the riding is Spencer Chandra Herbert, who was elected in the 2009 British Columbia general election.

History

Electoral history

References

External links
 Electoral district map from Elections BC

British Columbia provincial electoral districts
Politics of Vancouver
Provincial electoral districts in Greater Vancouver and the Fraser Valley